The Battle of Chipana took place on 12 April 1879, during the War of the Pacific between Chile and Peru. It was the first naval engagement between both navies and took place in front of Huanillos, off the (then) Bolivian coast, as the Peruvian corvette Unión and gunboat  found the Chilean corvette Magallanes on its way to Iquique.

After a two-hour running artillery duel, Unión suffered engine problems, the pursuit was called off. Magallanes escaped with minor damage and had completed part of its mission, delivering commissioned papers to Iquique, but could not complete its reconnaissance mission of finding if any guano ships were still trading in the zone.

History of South America
Naval battles involving Chile
Naval battles involving Peru
Naval battles of the War of the Pacific
Conflicts in 1879
1879 in Chile
Battles and conflicts without fatalities
Battle of Chipana
April 1879 events